This is a list of works by Murray Bookchin (1921–2006). For a more complete list, please see the Bookchin bibliography compiled by Janet Biehl.

Books 

 Our Synthetic Environment (1962, as Lewis Herber)
 Crisis in Our Cities (1965, as Lewis Herber)
 Post-Scarcity Anarchism (1971)
 Essay collection including "Ecology and Revolutionary Thought", "Towards a Liberatory Technology", "Desire and Need", and "Listen, Marxist!"
 The Spanish Anarchists (1976)
 Towards an Ecological Society (1980)
 The Ecology of Freedom (1982)
 The Modern Crisis (1986) 
 The Limits of the City (1974, 2nd ed. 1986)
 The Rise of Urbanization and the Decline of Citizenship (1987)
 Urbanization without Cities: The Rise and Decline of Citizenship (1992)
 From Urbanization to Cities: Towards a New Politics of Citizenship (1995)
 Remaking Society (1990)
 To Remember Spain: The Anarchist and Syndicalist Revolution of 1936 (1994) 
 The Philosophy of Social Ecology (1995)
 Re-Enchanting Humanity: A Defense of the Human Spirit Against Antihumanism, Misanthropy, Mysticism, and Primitivism (1995) 
 Social Anarchism or Lifestyle Anarchism (1995)
 Considering the Third Revolution: Popular Movements in the Revolutionary Era (1996, 1998)
 Anarchism, Marxism and the Future of the Left: Interviews and Essays, 1993–1998 (1999) 
 Social Ecology and Communalism (2007) 
 The Next Revolution: Popular Assemblies and the Promise of Direct Democracy (2015)

Books about Bookchin 

 Janet Biehl, ed., The Murray Bookchin Reader (1999)
 Janet Biehl, The Politics of Social Ecology: Libertarian Municipalism (1998) 
 Andy Price, Recovering Bookchin: Social Ecology and the Crises of Our Time (2012)
 Janet Biehl, Ecology or Catastrophe: The Life of Murray Bookchin (2015)
 Yavor Tarinski, ed., Enlightenment and Ecology: The Legacy of Murray Bookchin in the 21st Century (2021)

References 

Bookchin, Murray